is a Japanese light novel series by Ryo Mizuno, which features the apprentice wizard Louie as the hero. The series takes place on the continent of Alecrast on the world called Forcelia, and is related to the series Sword World RPG. It is a sibling series to Record of Lodoss War (also by Mizuno), taking place on a continent north of Lodoss Island.

An anime television series adaptation animated by J.C.Staff aired on Wowow from April to September 2001.

In Indonesia it is broadcast by Trans TV and TV7.

Characters 

 Louie  A member of the Magician's Guild in Ohfun and the adopted son of Carwes the guild's master. Muscular and a little on the dumb side; Louie is prone to getting drunk in bars, chasing after girls, and brawling when he should be studying his magic. As a result, he tends to use brute force instead of magic, much to the chagrin of his companions (for example, on his first adventure, Louie lost his temper when a troop of goblins clubbed him on the head and then broke his wand when he used it to club them back). Despite his shortcomings as a wizard, Louie possesses a strong sense of justice and is unfailingly loyal to those he considers his friends. Louie's stupidity mostly results as a lack of planning and forethought, he's actually a lot smarter than he usually appears to be, often figuring things out that others overlook. While it isn't mentioned in the anime (other than Louie's strong resemblance to him) it is strongly hinted in the manga that Louie is the illegitimate son of the King. , Jon Goiri (Spanish)

 Melissa  Adventurer and priestess to Mylee, god of war. Naive and idealistic, Melissa's dream is to serve a chosen hero of her patron god which of course causes her great despair when Mylee reveals her destined champion is Louie (in the anime she frequently says "This is against my will" several times an episode). Throughout the course of the series, Melissa gradually begins to realize that perfect heroes don't exist and by the end of the series not only fully accepts Louie as her chosen hero but may also have developed feelings for him as well. , Jaione Intsausti (Spanish)

 Genie  Adventurer and former soldier of Ohfun. She has a rather cool demeanor but Louie's stupid behavior tends to push her to the point of violence. A highly adept warrior, Genie's favorite weapon is a broadsword as big as herself and likewise is strong enough to slug it out on the same level as Louie. As the story progresses, Genie comes to respect Louie as a friend when she finds that he, unlike most men, doesn't look down on her because she is a woman and even teaches him basic sword fighting. , Maribel Legarreta (Spanish)

 Merrill  Adventurer, thief and part-time job worker with a fanatical obsession for money. When not adventuring, Merrill is either raising funds for the next adventure through various part-time jobs or looking at any scheme to get rich, including running booths at various events in Ohfun. Like Genie, Merril is driven crazy by Louie's behavior and frequently explodes in violence at him. , Ana Bego Egileor (Spanish)

 Aila  Member of the Magician's Guild and Louie's friend. Despite many attempts to get Louie on a date, especially considering her rather voluptuous frame, their relationship remains platonic and open much to her dismay. Although highly knowledgeable in magic theory and magical item lore (her chief area of study), Aila herself claims to be inferior to Louie in raw magical prowess. She also tends to go to pieces and pass out whenever trouble surfaces on adventures she tags along with. In the manga, Aila's character is more sultry than in the anime and she especially enjoys getting Louie flustered by flirting with him. , Ana Tere Bengoetxea (Spanish)

 Celecia  A beautiful elf girl the group met while journeying through a forest. 

 Anna Gannet , Jaione Instsausti (Spanish)Joan , Maribel Legarreta (Spanish)
 Three young teenage priestess of Mylee that hold Melissa in esteem. They have a low opinion of Louie and see him as a burden to Melissa during the entirety of the anime series. They don't appear in the manga.

 Dardanel : The main antagonist of the series.

 Media 
 Light novels First series1.  October 25, 1998 
2.  February 25, 1999 
3.  June 25, 1999 
4.  December 25, 1999 
5.  April 25, 2000 
6.  August 30, 2000 
7.  March 25, 2001 
8.  July 25, 2001 
9.  February 25, 2002 
0.  March 25, 2003: A side-story about Genie, Merrill, and Melissa before meeting Louie.Second series 
1. Rune Soldier in the Sword Kingdom
(Old edition) Sword World ・ Novell: Rune Soldier in the Sword Kingdom ( February 15, 1993)
(New edition) Rune Soldier in the Sword Kingdom ( September 20, 2001)

2. Rune Soldier in the Lakeshore Country
(Old edition) ( August 25, 1997)
(Corrected edition) ( September 1, 2001)

3. Rune Soldier in the Dust Country ( September 25, 2003)Third series'1. Farram's Sword Rune Soldier in the Sage's Country ( August 25, 2004) 
2. Farram's Sword: Rune Soldier on the Accursed Island ( March 25, 2005) (crossover with Record of Lodoss War) 
3. Farram's Sword: Rune Soldier in the Pastoral Country ( February 25, 2006)
4. Farram's Sword: Rune Soldier in the Steel Country ( December 20, 2006)
5. Farram's Sword: Rune Soldier on the Island of Gods ( December 25, 2007)
6. Farram's Sword: Rune Soldier on the Stormy Sea ( August 20, 2008)
7. Farram's Sword: Rune Soldier on the Smokefire Island ( January 20, 2011)
8. Farram's Sword: Rune Soldier in the Rune Land ( June 20, 2012）

 Anime 
The Rune Soldier'' anime consists of 24 episodes. The episodes are either a stand-alone adventure, or a story arc consisting of multiple episodes. In general the plot of each episode or story arc revolves around the group looking for, finding, and participating in an adventure. Probably due to interpretation or stylistic differences most episodes have a verbal spoken and written name that does not match exactly.

The anime had an NTSC release of September 13, 2005 by Section 23. There were six discs total.

References

External links
  Official website
 

1997 Japanese novels
2001 anime television series debuts
Anime and manga based on light novels
Action anime and manga
ADV Films
ADV Manga
Adventure anime and manga
Comedy anime and manga
Fantasy anime and manga
Fujimi Fantasia Bunko
Fujimi Shobo manga
J.C.Staff
Light novels
Record of Lodoss War
Shōnen manga
Wowow original programming